Tex-Mex is a 1979 Tejano album by Freddy Fender.

Track listing 
"You're Turning Down the Flame of Love Too Low"
"Leaning"
"If That's All That's Worrying You"
"Just Because"
"I Really Don't Want to Know"
"Walking Piece of Heaven"
"She Came to the Valley"
"I'm a Fool to Care"
"She's Gone"
"Sweet Summer Day"
"Forgive"
"Cajun Stomp"

References 

Freddy Fender albums
1979 albums
ABC Records albums